Gunnor or Gunnora ( – ) was Duchess of Normandy by marriage to Richard I of Normandy, having previously been his long-time mistress. She functioned as regent of Normandy during the absence of her spouse, as well as the adviser to him and later to his successor, their son Richard II.

Life
The names of Gunnor's parents are unknown, but Robert of Torigni wrote that her father was a forester from the Pays de Caux and according to Dudo of Saint-Quentin she was of noble Danish ancestry. Gunnor was probably born . Her family held sway in western Normandy and Gunnor herself was said to be very wealthy. Her marriage to Richard I was of great political importance, both to her husband and her progeny. Her brother, Herfast de Crepon, was progenitor of a great Norman family. Her sisters and nieces married some of the most important nobles in Normandy. 	

Robert of Torigni recounts a story of how Richard met Gunnor. She was living with her sister Seinfreda, the wife of a local forester, when Richard, hunting nearby, heard of the beauty of the forester's wife. He is said to have ordered Seinfreda to come to his bed, but the lady substituted her unmarried sister, Gunnor. Richard, it is said, was pleased that by this subterfuge he had been saved from committing adultery and together they had three sons and three daughters. Unlike other territorial rulers, the Normans recognized marriage by cohabitation or more danico. But when Richard was prevented from nominating their son Robert to be Archbishop of Rouen, the two were married, "according to the Christian custom", making their children legitimate in the eyes of the church.

Gunnor attested ducal charters up into the 1020s, was skilled in languages and was said to have had an excellent memory. She was one of the most important sources of information on Norman history for Dudo of St. Quentin. As Richard's widow she is mentioned accompanying her sons on numerous occasions. That her husband depended on her is shown in the couple's charters where she is variously regent of Normandy, a mediator and judge, and in the typical role of a medieval aristocratic mother, an arbitrator between her husband and their oldest son Richard II.

Gunnor was a founder and supporter of Coutances Cathedral and laid its first stone. In one of her own charters after Richard's death she gave two alods to the abbey of Mont Saint-Michel, namely Britavilla and Domjean, given to her by her husband in dower, which she gave for the soul of her husband, and the weal of her own soul and that of her sons "count Richard, archbishop Robert, and others..." She also attested a charter, to that same abbey by her son, Richard II, shown as Gonnor matris comitis (mother of the count). Gunnor, both as wife and countess, was able to use her influence to see her kin favored, and several of the most prominent Anglo-Norman families on both sides of the English Channel are descended from her, her sisters and nieces. Gunnor died .

Family
Richard and Gunnor were parents to several children:
 Richard II "the Good", Duke of Normandy 
 Robert, Archbishop of Rouen, Count of Evreux, died 1037
 Mauger, Count of Corbeil
 Robert Danus, died between 985 and 989
 another son
 Emma of Normandy –1052, married first to Æthelred, King of England and secondly Cnut the Great, King of England.
 Hawise of Normandy, wife of Geoffrey I, Duke of Brittany
 Maud of Normandy, wife of Odo II of Blois, Count of Blois, Champagne and Chartres

Notes

References

950s births
1030s deaths
Year of birth uncertain

Year of death uncertain
10th-century Normans
10th-century French women
11th-century Normans
11th-century French women
Duchesses of Normandy
House of Normandy
10th-century Norman women
10th-century French people
11th-century French people
11th-century Norman women
10th-century women rulers